Robert Sabolič (born September 18, 1988) is a Slovenian ice hockey player currently playing for EC VSV in the ICE Hockey League (ICEHL). He participated at several IIHF World Championships as a member of the Slovenia men's national ice hockey team. He has previously played with Swedish team, Södertälje.

During the 2013–14 season he has won the German championship with Ingolstadt. Sabolič was an important part in Ingolstadt's success, with 14 points (9 goals, 4 assists) in 21 postseason games. In addition, he has scored the most goals during the 2013–14 DEL playoffs.

After parts of two seasons with Torpedo Nizhny Novgorod, Sabolič left the Kontinental Hockey League (KHL) following the 2018–19 season, signing a one-year contract with Swiss club, HC Ambrì-Piotta of the NL, on 26 July 2019.

Career statistics

Regular season and playoffs

International

References

External links

 Profile at SiOL portal

1988 births
Living people
Admiral Vladivostok players
HC Ambrì-Piotta players
ERC Ingolstadt players
HK Acroni Jesenice players
Krefeld Pinguine players
IK Oskarshamn players
Ice hockey players at the 2014 Winter Olympics
Ice hockey players at the 2018 Winter Olympics
Olympic ice hockey players of Slovenia
Sportspeople from Jesenice, Jesenice
Slovenian ice hockey right wingers
Södertälje SK players
HK Poprad players
HC Sparta Praha players
Slovenian expatriate sportspeople in Germany
Slovenian expatriate sportspeople in the Czech Republic
Slovenian expatriate sportspeople in Russia
Torpedo Nizhny Novgorod players
EC VSV players
Slovenian expatriate ice hockey people
Slovenian expatriate sportspeople in Slovakia
Slovenian expatriate sportspeople in Sweden
Slovenian expatriate sportspeople in Switzerland
Slovenian expatriate sportspeople in Austria
Expatriate ice hockey players in Austria
Expatriate ice hockey players in Switzerland
Expatriate ice hockey players in Sweden
Expatriate ice hockey players in Slovakia
Expatriate ice hockey players in the Czech Republic
Expatriate ice hockey players in Russia
Expatriate ice hockey players in Germany